Emma Eliza Laughlin (1866-1962) was an American librarian, amateur botanist and educator known for her research on mustard plants and her vast herbarium.  Though she had no formal botany education and worked as a high school teacher, she published extensively on the flora of Ohio, particularly rare plants, and founded the Barnesville, Ohio public library. She contributed her herbarium to Ohio State University.

References 

American botanists
American women botanists
1866 births
1962 deaths